Moumouni is a given name and a surname. Notable people with the name include:

Surname:
Abdou Moumouni (born 1982), Togolese footballer
Abdou Moumouni University, the only public university in Niger
Basile Adjou Moumouni (1922–2019), Beninese physician
Yacouba Moumouni, singer and flautist, leader of the jazz-ethnic band from Niger, Mamar Kassey

Given name:
Moumouni Adamou Djermakoye (1939–2009), Nigerien politician
Moumouni Dagano (born 1981), Burkinabé football player
Moumouni Fabre (born 1953), Burkinabé politician